Adam Wallace-Harrison (born 24 September 1979 in Perth, Western Australia) is a rugby union footballer who played professionally for the Queensland Reds in Super Rugby. His regular playing position was lock. He has previously played for the Brumbies and NTT Communications Shining Arcs.

External links 
 Reds profile
 itsrugby.co.uk profile

Australian rugby union players
Queensland Reds players
ACT Brumbies players
Rugby union locks
Sportsmen from Western Australia
1979 births
Living people
Expatriate rugby union players in Japan
Rugby union players from Perth, Western Australia